Deiodinase (or "Monodeiodinase") is a peroxidase enzyme that is involved in the activation or deactivation of thyroid hormones.

Types 

Types of deiodinases include:

Iodothyronine deiodinases catalyze release of iodine directly from the thyronine hormones. They are selenocysteine-dependent membrane proteins with a catalytic domain resembling Peroxiredoxins (Prx). Three related isoforms, deiodinase type I, II, and III, contribute to activation and inactivation of the initially released hormone precursor T4 (thyroxine) into T3 (triiodothyronine) or rT3 (reverse triiodothyronine) in target cells. The enzymes catalyze a reductive elimination of iodine (the different isoforms attack different thyronine positions), thereby oxidizing themselves similar to Prx, followed by a reductive recycling of the enzyme.

Iodotyrosine deiodinase contributes to breakdown of thyroid hormones. It releases iodine, for renewed use, from iodinated tyrosines resulting from catabolism of iodothyronines. Iodotyrosine deiodinase employs a flavin mononucleotide cofactor and belongs to the NADH oxidase/flavin reductase superfamily.

Starvation response 

In starvation or severe stress, deiodinase type 1 is inhibited which lowers circulating levels of T3 (due to it being the main source of peripherally converted T3 from T4 in the plasma), causing a decrease in the metabolic rate. Intuitively, if plasma levels of T3 fall, there would be a compensatory rise in TSH, the secretion of which is inhibited by T3. However, because type 2 deiodinase mediates the conversion of T4 to T3 within the pituitary and CNS, and because caloric restriction does not affect this enzyme, local T3 levels in the pituitary are normal.Thus, the thyrotrophs (endocrine cells in pituitary) in the pituitary continue to have adequate amounts of T3, and no compensatory rise in TSH occurs.
This effect of caloric restriction makes sense for someone who is starving because it tends to conserve body stores of fuel. On the other hand, this effect makes it more difficult to lose weight intentionally while dieting.

Selenium

Selenium in iodothyronine deiodinase, as selenocysteine, plays a crucial role in determining the free circulating levels of T3. Selenium deficiency can have implications in fall of T3 levels.

References

External links 
 

Enzymes
Thyroid
Starvation